The Cinema Guild Inc. is a film distribution company. It was established by Philip and Mary-Ann Hobel, producers known for their work in documentaries and features, including the film Tender Mercies.

Since 1968, the Cinema Guild has been a distributor of both documentary and fiction films (narrative features and shorts), offering distribution in all markets, including educational, non-theatrical, theatrical, television, cable, internet, and home video.

The Cinema Guild launched its own home video brand in March 2009. The company released its first Blu-ray, Marwencol, in 2011.

Internationally acclaimed filmmakers who have released films through the Cinema Guild include Claire Denis, Jacques Rivette, Agnès Varda, Pedro Costa, Béla Tarr, Hong Sang-soo, Alexander Sokurov, Nuri Bilge Ceylan, and Kazik Radwanski.

The distributor has also worked with such U.S.-based independent filmmakers as Andrew Bujalski, Jem Cohen, and Matthew Porterfield.

Releases
 24 City (Jia Zhangke, 2008)
 35 Shots of Rum (Claire Denis, 2008)
 The Beaches of Agnès (Agnès Varda, 2008)
 Jerichow (Christian Petzold, 2008)
 The Order of Myths (Margaret Brown, 2008)
 Our Beloved Month of August (Miguel Gomes, 2008)
 Shirin (Abbas Kiarostami, 2008)
 Around a Small Mountain (Jacques Rivette, 2009)
 Beeswax (Andrew Bujalski, 2009)
 The Betrayal (Ellen Kuras, 2009)
 Change Nothing (Pedro Costa, 2009)
 Everyone Else (Maren Ade, 2009)
 Sweetgrass (Lucien Castaing-Taylor and Ilisa Barbash, 2009)
 Aurora (Cristi Puiu, 2010)
 Marwencol (Jeff Malmberg, 2010)
 Putty Hill (Matthew Porterfield, 2010)
 The Strange Case of Angelica (Manoel de Oliveira, 2010)
 The Day He Arrives (Hong Sang-soo, 2011)
 Once Upon a Time in Anatolia (Nuri Bilge Ceylan, 2011)
 Patience (After Sebald) (Grant Gee, 2011)
 The Turin Horse (Béla Tarr and Ágnes Hranitzky, 2011)
 Two Years at Sea (Ben Rivers, 2011)
 Planet of Snail (Yi Seung Jun, 2012)
 Neighboring Sounds (Kleber Mendonça Filho, 2012)
 Step Up to the Plate (Paul Lacoste, 2012)
 The Law in These Parts (Ra’anan Alexandrowicz, 2012)
 Night Across the Street (Raúl Ruiz, 2012)
 Leviathan (Lucien Castaing-Taylor and Verena Paravel, 2012)
 Andre Gregory: Before and After Dinner (Cindy Kleine, 2013)
 Museum Hours (Jem Cohen, 2012)
 Viola (Matías Piñeiro, 2013)
 The Last Time I Saw Macao (João Pedro Rodrigues and João Rui Guerra da Mata, 2013)
 Cousin Jules (Dominique Benicheti, 2013)
 Manakamana (Stephanie Spray, Pacho Velez, 2013)
 What Now? Remind Me (Joaquim Pinto, 2013)
 Norte, the End of History (Lav Diaz, 2013)
 Stray Dogs (Tsai Ming-liang, 2013)
 Actress (Robert Greene, 2014)
 Los Angeles Plays Itself (Thom Andersen, 2014)
 Maidan (Sergei Loznitsa, 2014)
 When Evening Falls on Bucharest or Metabolism (Corneliu Porumboiu, 2015)
 Jauja (Lisandro Alonso, 2015)
 Because I Was a Painter (Christophe Cognet, 2015)
 About Elly (Asghar Farhadi, 2015)
 The Princess of France (Matías Piñeiro, 2015)
 Horse Money (Pedro Costa, 2015)
 Counting (Jem Cohen, 2015)
 Starless Dreams (Mehrdad Oskouei, 2017)
 In Pursuit of Silence (Patrick Shen, 2017)
 The Wrong Light (Josie Swantek Heitz and Dave Adams, 2017)
 The Death of Louis XIV (Albert Serra, 2017)
 4 Days in France (Jérôme Reybaud, 2017)
 On the Beach at Night Alone (Hong Sang-soo, 2017)
 Western (Valeska Grisebach, 2017)
 El Mar La Mar (Joshua Bonnetta & J.P. Sniadecki, 2017)
 Claire's Camera (Hong Sangsoo, 2017)
 The Day After (Hong Sangsoo, 2017)
 En el Séptimo Día (On the Seventh Day) (Jim McKay, 2018)
 Hale County This Morning, This Evening (RaMell Ross, 2018)
 The Wild Pear Tree (Nuri Bilge Ceylan, 2019)
 Hotel by the River (Hong Sangsoo, 2019)
 Suburban Birds (Qiu Sheng, 2019)
 Grass (Hong Sangsoo, 2018)
 The Wandering Soap Opera (Raul Ruiz, 2019)
 End of the Century (Lucio Castro, 2019)
 I'm Leaving Now (Lindsey Cordero & Armando Croda, 2019)
 Chinese Portrait (Wang Xiaoshuai, 2019)
 I Was at Home, But... (Angela Schanelec, 2020)
 Liberté (Albert Serra, 2020)
 Yourself and Yours (Hong Sangsoo, 2020)
 Sunless Shadows (Mehrdad Oskouei, 2020)
 Ghost Tropic (Bas Devos, 2020)
 Film About a Father Who (Lynne Sachs, 2020)
 Un Film Dramatique (Éric Baudelaire, 2020)
 Swimming Out Till the Sea Turns Blue (Jia Zhangke, 2020)
 The Woman Who Ran (Hong Sangsoo, 2021)
 499 (Rodrigo Reyes, 2021)
 Isabella (Matías Piñeiro, 2021)
 Anne at 13,000 ft. (Kazik Radwanski, 2021)
 The Two Sights (Joshua Bonnetta, 2021)
 Expedition Content (Ernst Karel and Veronika Kusumaryati, 2021)
 Introduction (Hong Sang-soo, 2021)
 A Night of Knowing Nothing (Payal Kapadia, 2021)
 Rock Bottom Riser (Fern Silva, 2017)
 The Girl and the Spider (Ramon Zürcher and Silvan Zürcher, 2021)
 In Front of Your Face (Hong Sang-soo, 2021)
 Cane Fire (Anthony Banua-Simon, 2021)
 I Am A Town (Mischa Richter, 2021)
 Dos Estaciones (Juan Pablo González, 2022)
 The Novelist's Film (Hong Sang-soo, 2022)
 Walk Up (Hong Sang-soo, 2022)
 Human Flowers Of Flesh (Helena Wittmann, 2022)

References

External links
Official website

Film distributors of the United States